"Metal Health", sometimes listed as "Metal Health (Bang Your Head)", "Bang Your Head" or, as it was listed on the Billboard Hot 100, "Bang Your Head (Metal Health)", is a song by the American heavy metal band Quiet Riot on their breakthrough album, Metal Health. One of their best known hits and receiving heavy MTV music video and radio play, "Metal Health" was the band's second top 40 hit, peaking at #31 on the Billboard Hot 100.

Being about the headbanging subculture, the song caught the attention of many heavy metal fans on its release. The single contained both the studio-recorded version and a live version, which was later released on their Greatest Hits compilation. The lyric, "well now you're here, there's no way back", eventually became the title for Quiet Riot's documentary, released in 2015.

The main riff/structure of the song comes from an older track entitled "No More Booze," which was originally performed by Snow, Carlos and Tony Cavazo's pre-Quiet Riot band. A live version of the song can be heard on the At Last recordings, which finally received a release in 2017.

Music video
Produced for $19,000 and employing students as extras, the music video was filmed in the Walt Disney Modular Theater and hallways of the California Institute of the Arts.

Personnel

Quiet Riot
Kevin DuBrow – lead vocals
Carlos Cavazo – guitars, backing vocals
Rudy Sarzo – bass, backing vocals
Frankie Banali – drums, backing vocals

Additional personnel
Chuck Wright – bass

Charts

Accolades

Uses in popular culture
The song was heard in the 2009 film Babylon A.D., 1984 film Footloose and its 2011 remake. It was also used in the opening credits of the movies Crank (2006) and The Wrestler (2008), and in a TV commercial for Hyundai first shown during CBS's coverage of Super Bowl XLVII on February 3, 2013.

"Weird Al" Yankovic performed the song as part of his 1985 polka medley "Hooked on Polkas" from his album Dare to Be Stupid.

The song was featured in the professional wrestling video game Showdown: Legends of Wrestling in 2004.

The song was featured in the 2006 video game Grand Theft Auto: Vice City Stories on the fictional in-game radio station "V-Rock".

The song was used in the music games Guitar Hero Encore: Rocks The 80s, Guitar Hero Live and Rock Band Blitz.

References

Quiet Riot songs
1983 singles
Songs written by Carlos Cavazo
1983 songs